Sir William John Aston, KCMG (19 September 1916 – 21 May 1997) was an Australian politician. Born in Sydney, he attended state schools before becoming an accountant and company director. He served in World War II from 1942 to 1944, and was involved in local politics as a member of Waverley Council. In 1955, he was elected to the Australian House of Representatives as the Liberal member for Phillip. He held the seat until 1961, when he was defeated by Syd Einfeld of the Labor Party. Aston returned to the House in 1963, defeating Einfeld. On 21 February 1967 Aston was elected Speaker. He held this position until the Liberal Government's defeat at the hands of Gough Whitlam in 1972, when Aston lost his seat. He died in 1997. His sons included Ray Aston, the member of the NSW Legislative Assembly who died young in 1988.

References

Liberal Party of Australia members of the Parliament of Australia
Members of the Australian House of Representatives for Phillip
Members of the Australian House of Representatives
1916 births
1997 deaths
Australian Knights Commander of the Order of St Michael and St George
Australian politicians awarded knighthoods
Speakers of the Australian House of Representatives
20th-century Australian politicians
Mayors of Waverley, New South Wales
Australian Army personnel of World War II
Australian Army officers